The Admiralty Research Establishment (commonly known as ARE) was formed on 1 April 1984 from various Admiralty establishments. It became part of the Defence Research Agency on 1 April 1991.

Constituent parts on formation
 Admiralty Surface Weapons Establishment (ASWE), Portsdown, Portsmouth (1959–1984)

 Admiralty Marine Technology Establishment (1978–1984) – formed from amalgamation of other research departments in 1977

 Admiralty Underwater Weapons Establishment (AUWE), Portland, Dorset (1959–1984).

References

Government munitions production in the United Kingdom
Government agencies established in 1984
Admiralty departments
Military research establishments of the United Kingdom
1991 disestablishments in the United Kingdom
1984 establishments in the United Kingdom